Maospati is small city (district level) in East Java, Indonesia.

Populated places in East Java